The Casserole Club is a 2011 American drama film, directed by Steve Balderson. The film won five awards at the 2011 New York Visionfest. In this film set against the backdrop of the 1969 moonwalk, a group of suburban housewives hold dinner parties to test out their new casseroles. As boozy flirtation begins to dominate the gatherings - and more than recipes start getting swapped - the story shifts from stylized humor to a drama about irresponsibility, selfishness and damaged people.

Cast
Daniela Sea ... Jerome Holleran
Jane Wiedlin ... Marjorie Lavon
Susan Traylor ... Sugar Bainbridge
Kevin Richardson ... Conrad Bainbridge
Michael Maize ... Max Beedum
Hunter Bodine ... Burt Johnson
Anthony Pedone ... Manson Newscaster
Iris Berry ... The Broad
Garrett Swann ... Sterline Bloom
Starina Johnson ... Kitty Bloom
Pleasant Gehman ... Florene Johnson
Mark Booker ... Leslie Holleran

Awards

Won
2011 New York Visionfest:
Best Male Actor - Kevin Richardson
Best Female Actor - Susan Traylor
Best Directing - Steve Balderson
Best Production - Steve Balderson
Best Production Design - Steve Balderson

Nominated
2011 New York Visionfest:
Best Cinematography - Steve Balderson
Original Score - Rob Kleiner
Best Writing - Frankie Krainz

Reviews
Danielle Riendeau from After Ellen gave a positive review of the film, saying the film "offers a bizarre, compelling, and ultimately fascinating ride through the outwardly pretty yet-horrific lives of “normal people”." and "the soundtrack is as kitschy and catchy as the visuals are bright".

Jonathan Hickman from Daily Film Fix made note that he was not a "fan of the visual scope and digital look of the film", but mentioned it was Steve Balderson's best film to date.

Film Threat's Mark Bell gave the film a four out of five, writing a positive review and calling the acting "wonderful.

References

External links

Official Website

2011 films
2011 drama films
American drama films
2010s English-language films
2010s American films